Robert Earl Kaske (1 June 1921 – 8 August 1989) was an American professor of medieval literature. He spent most of his career at Cornell University in Ithaca, New York, where he was the Avalon Foundation Professor in the Humanities, and where he founded one of the preeminent medieval studies graduate programs in North America. His published output included lengthy interpretations of Beowulf and of poems and passages by Dante and Chaucer, and frequently constituted leading studies. Kaske particularly enjoyed solving cruxes, with articles on problematic passages in works such as Pearl, Piers Plowman, the Divine Comedy, The Husband's Message, The Descent into Hell, and Beowulf.

Born in Cincinnati and a straight-A student in high school, Kaske studied liberal arts at Xavier University and joined a variety of student literary organizations there. He was a four-year member of the Reserve Officers' Training Corps, and was commissioned a second lieutenant before his 1942 graduation; much of the next four years was spent with the Army in the South Pacific during World War II. While there he read a story about a dusk-to-dawn conversation between two professors and, entranced by the prospect of such intellectual discussions, decided on an academic career. Kaske enrolled in the English literature program at the University of North Carolina at Chapel Hill (UNC) on the back of the G.I. Bill, received his master's in 1947, and his Ph.D. in 1950.

From 1950 to 1963 Kaske held posts at Washington University in St. Louis, Pennsylvania State University, UNC, and the University of Illinois at Urbana–Champaign, rising from lecturer to full professor along the way; he termed his departure from UNC as the time he "published himself out of paradise". A visiting professorship at Cornell in 1963 became permanent in 1964, and Kaske remained at the university for the rest of his life.

A popular and "Falstaffian" professor, Kaske, along with the medieval studies program he founded, was credited by colleagues with producing the backbone of the discipline's next scholastic generation. His editorial imprint was visible in the works of many, including former students and those who submitted papers to the journal Traditio, which he edited. Over the course of his career he collected what one former student termed "most of the awards and honors possible for a medieval scholar", including fellowships from the National Endowment for the Humanities and the American Council of Learned Societies, and two Guggenheim Fellowships.

Early life and education 

Robert Kaske, who went by Bob, was born on 1 June 1921 in Cincinnati, Ohio. His parents were Herman C. Kaske, a postal clerk with the United States Postal Service, and Ann Rose Kaske ( Laake). Robert Kaske attended St. Martin's, a Catholic elementary school, and later the boys prep school Elder High School, where he received straight As across four years of English, Latin, and religion, and missed only a single day of school. While there he worked on the school newspaper and the yearbook, won the school's Latin contest, and played baseball; he graduated from the modern English course in 1938. In a yearbook filled with humorous projected jobs for the graduates, such as "dog-catcher" and "pretzel-twister", Kaske was an exception: "Robert Kaske, Editor."

After graduating from high school, Kaske matriculated at Xavier University, where he studied the liberal arts. Kaske was a four-year member of the Heidelberg Club, which described itself as intended "to further interest in the language, culture, history and transitions of the Germanic peoples". In his sophomore year Kaske began a three-year stint with the Xavier University News, writing the column "Quid Ergo?" Taken from Seneca, the Latin name of the column meant "So what?"; Kaske described his topics as "touching on literature, politics, philosophy, economics, history, school affairs, slapstick, slapstick and slapstick", and involving "a schoolboy telling the world what is wrong with it". That year he also joined The Athenaeum and the Mermaid Tavern, an undergraduate literary paper and literary club, respectively. He became editor in chief of the former his senior year, and "Host" of the latter. Kaske still spoke fondly of the Mermaid Tavern, where students presented their literary works and discussed those of the masters, in his later years. As a junior, a year in which he was inducted into the Jesuit academic honorary fraternity Alpha Sigma Nu, he joined the Masque Society, a theatrical group; he played Peter Dolan in a school production of Father Malachy's Miracle that year, and as a senior appeared in another play, Whispering in the Dark. Between his junior and senior years, Kaske spent much of the summer writing radio scripts. Also as a senior Kaske cofounded the Philosophy Club, a society for students interested in philosophical research, and joined The Traditionists, a literary club which that year devoted their meetings to reading Dante's Inferno. He placed sixth or seventh in an intercollegiate writing contest the same year. Kaske graduated magna cum laude with a Bachelor of Arts on 3 June 1942.

World War II 
Kaske had joined the Reserve Officers' Training Corps in his first semester at Xavier, and even before his graduation was ordered to active service. He was commissioned a second lieutenant in the Army's field artillery on 25 May 1942, and ordered to report to Fort Thomas for a physical examination and assignment, with a furlough to account for his June commencement. Speaking to Kaske and 24 others, the commencement speaker, Archbishop John T. McNicholas, stated "[m]ay I assure the Second Lieutenants of this graduating class that the Archdiocese of Cincinnati is proud of them. It is happy to know that Xavier University is not only teaching theoretical patriotism, but that it is actually serving our country in the greatest crisis in its history."

Kaske served as a platoon leader and company commander with the 819th Tank Destroyer Battalion, taking him to ports in the United States, Hawaii (including Black Sand Beach), the Palau Islands (Peleliu and Angaur), and the Mariana Islands (Guam and Saipan). During a leave at the end of 1943, while stationed at Fort Hood, he served as a best man at a wedding in Cleburne, Texas, took out his own marriage license a week later, and married in January. His wife was Mildred Mae Reinerman, a 21-year-old bookkeeper. By 1945, Kaske was in Peleliu, where the 819th searched for remaining Japanese soldiers, defended the airstrip, and shelled Japanese-held islands. Kaske was discharged from the Army on 1 June 1946, having risen to the rank of first lieutenant.

Graduate studies 
As a student at Xavier, Kaske had anticipated a business career, possibly in advertising. That changed while filling time at the end of the war on a coral island in the Pacific, when he read a story about two professors engrossed in conversation from dusk to dawn; as the sun rose, one professor regretfully said he needed to prepare for class, and the other replied that he had been so absorbed he forgot he was not in his own house. Entranced by the prospect of such engaging intellectual conversations and aided by the tuition benefits afforded veterans by the G.I. Bill, Kaske set out for an academic life.

After talking it over with Father Paul Sweeney, a professor of English at Xavier and founder and patron of the Mermaid Tavern, Kaske entered the English literature program at the University of North Carolina at Chapel Hill (UNC) in 1946. As at Xavier, Kaske wrote for a student paper, Factotum, including poems, and at least one short story: "Sergeant Hinchey's Homecoming", about a veteran regaling an unsuspecting church group with ribald tales from service in Hawaii, Angaur, Texas, and Kwajalein. Under the direction of Hardin Craig, Kaske wrote his Master's thesis on George Chapman's tragedies, receiving his degree in 1947. If not for Craig's departure to the University of Missouri, wrote the medieval scholar (and former Kaske student) Emerson Brown Jr., Kaske might have become a Renaissance scholar. Instead, under George Coffman's direction, he wrote his Ph.D. dissertation on the Late Medieval poem Piers Plowman and graduated in 1950.

Career 
Kaske was hired as an English instructor at Washington University in St. Louis by April 1950, before his June dissertation defense. He began teaching a variety of courses in medieval language and literature, including studies of Dante. At Washington, Kaske found the intellectual engagement he had been looking for, including with colleagues Vladimir Jelinek and Ernst Abrahamson. He also began to publish, with articles on Piers Plowman in each of 1951, 1952, and 1957. In 1952 he was promoted to assistant professor, and in 1955 he was awarded a  research grant for study during the summer.

Kaske left Washington University in 1957, then taught at Pennsylvania State University from 1957 to 1958. He left Pennsylvania to return to his alma mater UNC, where he began his associate professorship on 1 September 1958. An article on the epic poem Beowulf was published in the university's journal Studies in Philology shortly before his arrival, followed in 1959 by another article on Piers Plowman. A year later, Kaske was awarded a grant by the American Council of Learned Societies to work on a book, provisionally titled The Heroic Ideal in Old English Poetry. In 1961 Kaske was awarded a Guggenheim Fellowship to study heroism and the hero in Old English poetry, and served as secretary of the Modern Language Association's Middle English group. Kaske enjoyed packed classes and the esteem of his colleagues at UNC, but soon began receiving attractive offers from other institutions.

Cornell 
In the fall semester of 1963, Kaske, who later admitted he was "looking around" and anxious to leave Illinois, took a six-month visiting professorship at Cornell University in Ithaca, New York. The following year, Cornell made an offer for a permanent position, which Kaske accepted; he remained there for the rest of his life. In 1968—a year in which he was first listed in Who's Who in America—Kaske was awarded another grant by the American Council of Learned Societies, this time to travel to England and search for the sources of imagery in poems by the unknown Gawain Poet. Another grant by the organization followed in 1971, for further research into the heroic ideal in Old English poetry, and that year Kaske participated in a symposium on Geoffrey Chaucer held at the University of Georgia. During 1972–73 he was a Faculty Fellow of the university's Society for the Humanities, and in 1974 he was named the Avalon Foundation Professor in the Humanities, succeeding . In 1975, he was appointed chief editor of the journal Traditio, and in 1977, he again won a Guggenheim Fellowship, this time to undertake research on the sources and methodology for the interpretation of medieval imagery. In 1984–85, the National Endowment for the Humanities awarded Kaske a Fellowship for Independent Study and Research; he intended to use it to complete a manual for scholars of medieval literature. As part of the fellowship Kaske directed a seminar on "Latin Christian Tradition in Medieval Literature", which presented the material from the book Kaske was working on.

At Cornell, Kaske founded a medieval studies graduate program, which Old English scholar Fred C. Robinson said came to become "one of the great seminaries of medieval scholars in North America during the latter part of the twentieth century". The program required all medieval literature students to take courses and intensive examinations in at least four medieval languages and literatures, and to have or learn French, German, and classical and medieval Latin, in addition to two semesters of Latin palaeography; some "survivors" termed it the "Parris Island of medieval studies". Just Kaske's introduction to medieval studies, a semester-long seminar, drew students from Yale and other universities, while the overall program, his colleagues said, "produced a group of scholars who have become the backbone of the next generation in medieval studies, and who, in their collective achievement and their dedication to the pedagogical and scholarly ideals of their mentor, constitute Bob’s true monument".

Kaske was known for his loyalty to his students, and his love of learning and teaching. Kaske was described as a "Falstaffian figure", and popular with students. "If we were students all of the time," Brown wrote, "Robert Kaske was a teacher all of the time." Students would frequently drop by Kaske's house unannounced to seek his input, bibliographic references, or access to his rich library, which Kaske amassed over the years despite his modest background and academic salary. Even once graduated, Kaske would continue to edit students' drafts; meanwhile, he "even turned the letter of recommendation into an art form".

Around 1960, Kaske joined a panel discussion in which he defended patristic learning—the study of early Christian writers—as a way of interpreting vernacular literature. The discussion was published, and republished, in essay form, and gained Kaske a reputation as a strident proponent of using medieval learning to understand the literature, as opposed to the "New Criticism" school of thought that argued that medieval poetry should be read in a contextual vacuum. The reputation overlooked the balance Kaske struck between focusing on careful reading of the literature, and bringing in exegetical information where prudent. Kaske nonetheless firmly believed that such contextual learning remained one of the most promising ways to make new discoveries about the meaning conveyed by literary works. Listening to Kaske lecture for two hours on "How to Use Biblical Exegesis for the Interpretation of Medieval Literature" at the Dartmouth Dante Institute in 1985, Madison U. Sowell wrote that "I learned more in one exhilarating afternoon about the 'nuts and bolts' of using biblical commentaries to interpret medieval literature than I had in three-and-a-half years at my Ivy League graduate school." He was a "master" at combining "insight and scholarly rigor", wrote Brown, joining "imagination in literary interpretation with the painstaking historical research required to gather supporting evidence". On top of this, a colleague wrote, Kaske added "a kind of native intuition about what a medieval poet might want to say".

Awards and distinctions 
Kaske, Brown wrote, "received most of the awards and honors possible for a medieval scholar". These included two Guggenheim Fellowships, a grant and a fellowship from the National Endowment for the Humanities, a grant from the American Philosophical Society, a Senior Fellowship at the Southeastern Institute of Medieval and Renaissance Studies, a fellowship at Cornell's Society for the Humanities, and grants-in-aid and a fellowship from the American Council of Learned Societies. He served on the editorial and advisory boards of Speculum, The Chaucer Review, A Manual of the Writings in Middle English, and Traditio. In 1975, Kaske was appointed chief editor of the latter journal, and elected Councillor in the Medieval Academy of America; seven years later, he was elected a Fellow of the Academy. In 1986, a Festschrift was published in Kaske's honor. The work was titled Magister Regis: Studies in Honor of Robert Earl, playing off of the name of Kaske's Border Collie, Rex.

Personal life 
Kaske and his first wife had a son, David Louis. But "the war left him little time for domesticity", Brown later wrote, and the marriage was over by 1958. That year Kaske married again, this time to Carol Vonckx, an English scholar who herself became a professor at Cornell. On 10 January 1966 they had a son, Richard James; at the time of his death, Kaske also had three grandchildren. He died of a brain tumor on 8 August 1989, at his Ithaca home on North Quarry Street. A funeral was held on 26 August, at Ithaca's Immaculate Conception Church, and a memorial service on 21 October at Sage Chapel, with contributions suggested to the university library's Dante-Petrarch or Icelandic collections.

Publications 
Kaske published more than 60 works throughout his career, including articles, chapters, reviews, and a book; most of these were listed in his 1986 Festschrift. Even among his shorter works, his output frequently constituted seminal studies. Kaske particularly enjoyed solving cruxes, producing what Robinson termed "some of the most dazzling literary explications of this century". These included articles on problematic passages in works such as Pearl, Piers Plowman, Dante's Divine Comedy, Chaucer's "The Summoner's Tale", The Husband's Message, The Descent into Hell, Troilus and Criseyde, Le Jeu d'Adam, and Beowulf. He also penned lengthy interpretations of Beowulf, and of poems and passages by Dante and Chaucer. Kaske's imprint was also evident in the works of others, including former students whose papers he marked up and returned, and those who submitted works to Traditio. "If we were working in the sciences," Brown wrote, "where team research is routine, Bob Kaske's bibliography would be many times its present length."

In 1988 Kaske published Medieval Christian Literary Imagery: A Guide to Interpretation, which colleagues referred to as a "magisterial work" that served as "the crowning achievement of his scholarly career". The work focused on Kaske's craft—using the available tools and sources to do the kind of scholarly explication that he himself did—and Kaske saw it as an extension of his teaching career.

Books

Articles 
  
  
  
  
  
  
 Edited and republished in 
  
  
  
  
  
  
  
  
  
  
 Abridged and added to in 
  
  
  
 Revised and republished in

Chapters 
  
 
 Reissued with an addendum on page 206 in 
 
  
 
  
 
 
 Abridged in

Reviews 
  
  
  
  
 A "review article," reviewing A Preface to Chaucer: Studies in Medieval Perspectives, by D. W. Robertson, Jr.

Other

Notes

References

Bibliography 
  
  
 
 
 
  
 
 
  
  
  
 
 
  
  

1921 births
1989 deaths
American medievalists
Military personnel from Cincinnati
Writers from Cincinnati
Xavier University alumni
University of North Carolina at Chapel Hill alumni
Cornell University faculty
Deaths from brain cancer in the United States
Deaths from cancer in New York (state)
United States Army personnel of World War II
20th-century American male writers
20th-century American historians
Elder High School alumni
Historians from Ohio